An execution chamber, or death chamber, is a room or chamber in which capital punishment is carried out. Execution chambers are almost always inside the walls of a maximum-security prison, although not always at the same prison where the death row population is housed. Inside the chamber is the device used to carry out the death sentence.

United States

In the United States, an execution chamber will usually contain a lethal injection table.  In most cases, a witness room is located adjacent to an execution chamber, where witnesses may watch the execution through glass windows. All except for two of the states which allow capital punishment are equipped with a death chamber, but many states rarely put them to use. The exceptions are New Hampshire, which has no execution chamber (although one inmate remains on death row since the abolition of capital punishment in that state is not retroactive) and California, which has no execution chambers after the lethal injection room and gas chamber were removed in 2019. Kansas, Nevada, and Wyoming are the only states to have an execution chamber, which is equipped to execute an inmate by lethal injection, which has never been used, while the states of New Jersey and New York formerly had lethal injection chambers which were never used while the death penalty remained legal.

The National Ethics Council of the American Institute of Architects ruled in 2019 that its members may continue to design execution chambers in jurisdictions where they are legal.

Locations

Notes:

Death penalty abolished in 2020. All remaining inmate's death sentences were commuted to life imprisonment by Gov. Jared Polis immediately upon abolition.

 Death penalty abolished in 2012. All remaining inmates death sentences were commuted to life imprisonment by the Connecticut Supreme Court in 2015.

 Death penalty abolished in 2011. All condemned prisoners sentences were commuted to life imprisonment by Gov. Pat Quinn immediately upon abolition.

 Death penalty abolished in 2013. Remaining inmate's death sentences were commuted to life imprisonment by Gov. Martin O'Malley in 2014.

 Death penalty abolished in 2019; one prisoner remains on death row under sentence of death.

 Death penalty abolished in 2007. All remaining inmate's death sentences were commuted to life imprisonment by Gov. Jon Corzine immediately upon abolition.

 Death penalty abolished in 2009. All remaining inmates death sentences were commuted to life imprisonment by the New Mexico Supreme Court in 2019.

 Death penalty abolished in 2007.  All remaining inmates death sentences were commuted to life imprisonment by the New York Court of Appeals immediately upon abolition.

 Closed in 2008 under David Paterson's administration.

 Death penalty abolished in 2021. All remaining inmates death sentences were automatically commuted to life imprisonment under the abolition statute.

 Death penalty abolished in 2018. All remaining inmates death sentences were commuted to life imprisonment by the Washington Supreme Court immediately upon abolition.

 If an execution does occur, the state will use its parole board meeting room at the state prison.

United Kingdom

In the United Kingdom, the execution chamber was part of a larger complex, often referred to as the "Execution Suite". The room, usually formed from two single prison cells, contained the large trapdoor, usually double-leaved, but in some older chambers such as at Oxford, single-leaved, and operating lever. The wooden beam from which the rope was suspended was usually set into the walls of the chamber above, with the floor removed. At Wandsworth Prison the floor was retained and holes allowed the rope and chains through. Oxford's chamber was of an old 19th-century type, and the beam was set into the walls of the chamber just above head height.

Such rooms were almost always built into one of the wings of a prison; following the recommendation of prison governors during the 1948 Royal Commission on capital punishment, further execution chambers were housed in purpose-built blocks, separate from the main prison. The last gallows to be constructed and used in Britain, at HMP Aberdeen, was built in 1962, and was used one year later for the hanging of Henry John Burnett, the last person to be executed in Scotland. A freestanding execution block was built at HMP Perth in 1965, but was never used. This was the last gallows to be constructed in the United Kingdom.

The last officially operational gallows in the United Kingdom (as several remained unofficially in other prisons), at Wandsworth Prison, was removed in 1994. Salvaged parts from it are currently in the possession of the National Justice Museum, having previously been at the HM Prison Service museum.

Japan

Japan has seven execution chambers, which are located at the Detention Houses in Tokyo, Nagoya, Osaka, Hiroshima, Fukuoka, Sendai and Sapporo. All executions in Japan are carried out by hanging. The execution chamber in Tokyo has a trap door. As the condemned is dropped, their body falls into a room below the execution chamber and the death is confirmed. In the Tokyo facility, the actual chamber is preceded by a room with a shrine to Amida Nyorai (Amitābha), a Buddhist deity, to allow for prayers and consultation with a religious official. The execution room in Tokyo is separated into two sections, with a total area of 25 m2.

Canada 
In Canada, executions were usually carried out in the county/municipality jail where they were committed. Alberta had gallows for the entire province in Fort Saskatchewan and Lethbridge. British Columbia had their executions in Oakalla (Burnaby).

The Don Jail was for murders committed in The City of Toronto and County of York. The Ontario County Jail in Whitby which was used for murders committed to what is now Durham Region. Most hangings were carried out using temporary gallows built in the jail yard although a few jails had permanent indoor facilities.

Gallery

References 

Execution equipment
Rooms